The 1993 Scotland rugby union tour of South Pacific was a series of matches played in Fiji, Tonga and Samoa in May and June 1993 by Scotland national rugby union team. It was an unofficial tour, because the Scottish Rugby Union did not award full international caps, due to the absence of the player involved in the British and Irish Lions tour to New Zealand.

Results
Scores and results list Scotland's points tally first.

References
 

tour
1993 in Oceanian rugby union
1993 rugby union tours
1993
1993
1993
1993